Darvish Mohammad Shah (also Romanized as Darvīsh Moḩammad Shāh) is a village in Siyahrud Rural District, in the Central District of Juybar County, Mazandaran Province, Iran. At the 2006 census, its population was 275, in 74 families.

References 

Populated places in Juybar County